Didier Etumba Longila (born 15 July 1955) is a retired Congolese military officer who served as Chief of General Staff of the Armed Forces of the Democratic Republic of the Congo from 2008 until 2018.

Etumba attended and graduated from the Royal Military Academy in Belgium before joining the Forces Armées Zaïroises. He held important positions in the Alliance of Democratic Forces for the Liberation of Congo during the First Congo War and Second Congo War. In 2007 he was appointed Chief of Staff of the Congolese Navy. He was made Chief of Staff of the Armed Forces the following year. He retired from the post on 14 July 2018. He subsequently worked for Emmanuel Ramazani Shadary's presidential campaign organisation.

References

|-
1

Living people
Democratic Republic of the Congo military personnel
1955 births
Royal Military Academy (Belgium) alumni
University of Kinshasa alumni
University of Liège alumni
People from the province of Équateur
21st-century Democratic Republic of the Congo people